Udgaon is a village in Shirol taluka in Kolhapur District, Maharashtra, India.
 
Udgaon is located 7.3 km distance from its Taluk Main Town Shirol. Udgaon is 35.7 km far from its District Main City Kolhapur. It is 309 km from its State Main City Mumbai.

Villages near this village with distances are Umalwad (2.9 km), Agar (4.4 km), Jainapur (5.1 km), Chipri (5.5 km), and Shirol (6.2 km). The nearest towns are Shirol (7.3 km), Hatkanangale (16.1 km), Karveer (33.7 km), and Kagal (36.1 km). Abdul Lat, Agar, Akiwat, Arjunwad, Aurwad, and Chinchwad are the villages along with this village in the same Shirol Taluk.

Villages in Kolhapur district